The Cleveland Browns joined the National Football League (NFL) in 1950 with the Baltimore Colts and San Francisco 49ers after having spent four seasons with the All-America Football Conference. The Browns' first selection as an NFL team was Ken Carpenter, a wide receiver from Oregon State. The team's most recent first round selection was Greg Newsome II, a cornerback from Northwestern.

Every year during April, each NFL franchise seeks to add new players to its roster through a collegiate draft known as "the NFL Annual Player Selection Meeting", which is more commonly known as the NFL Draft. Teams are ranked in inverse order based on the previous season's record, with teams missing the playoffs picking first, and then playoff teams in the inverse order of elimination. Teams have the option of trading away their picks to other teams for different picks, players, cash, or a combination thereof. Thus, it is not uncommon for a team's actual draft pick to differ from their assigned draft pick, or for a team to have extra or no draft picks in any round due to these trades. 

The Browns did not have any draft choices from 1996 to 1998, because then-owner Art Modell took all the team's players to Baltimore, Maryland, effectively stopping the franchise. However, the NFL mandated that the Browns' name, colors, and franchise history remain in Cleveland and that the team would reactivate by 1999. In 1999, the Browns selected number one overall, drafting University of Kentucky quarterback Tim Couch.

The Browns have selected number one overall five times: Bobby Garrett (1954), Tim Couch (1999), Courtney Brown (2000), Myles Garrett (2017) and Baker Mayfield (2018). The team has also selected number two overall only once and number three overall six times. The Browns have selected players from the University of Michigan five times, Ohio State University and the University of Southern California four times, and the University of Florida three times. Four eventual Hall of Famers were selected by the Browns: Doug Atkins, Jim Brown, Paul Warfield, and Ozzie Newsome.

Player selections
<onlyinclude>

Footnotes

References 

 
 
 
 
 
 
 
 

Cleveland Browns

first-round draft picks